Dylan Bruce (born April 21, 1980) is a Canadian actor known for his roles as Chris Hughes on the CBS daytime soap opera As the World Turns and Paul Dierden on BBC America and Space's Orphan Black.

Early life
Bruce was born on April 21, 1980, in Vancouver, British Columbia, and raised in Boundary Bay. Bruce attended University of Washington in Seattle, Washington, and graduated with a degree in Drama and Economics before moving to Los Angeles, California. He launched his career by modeling in Seattle through Seattle Models Guild. He appeared on the cover of the November 10, 2004, issue of Daily Variety.

Career
In 2005, Bruce landed his first role as Counter Terrorist Unit (CTU) Agent Martin Kail on 24: Conspiracy, a mobile-only spin-off of the television series 24. That same year, he guest-starred for two episodes on the NBC daytime soap opera Passions and appeared as a waiter on the television sitcom Joey. In 2006, he appeared on The Sopranos and on the reality television series Breaking Up with Shannen Doherty. He appeared as Sam Marquez (Vanessa Marcil)'s secretary, Anthony, on Las Vegas in 2007.

In 2007, Bruce landed his most notable role of Chris Hughes on the CBS daytime soap opera As the World Turns. Bruce became the eighth actor to play the role, succeeding Bailey Chase, who played the role from January 29, 2003 to January 20, 2005. Bruce made his debut on October 25, 2007. In August 2008, it was announced that Bruce was downgraded to recurring status. He made his final appearance on October 15, 2008.

Bruce made his big screen debut in the Denzel Washington thriller Unstoppable. In 2011, Bruce starred in Hallmark Channel's original film Love's Christmas Journey. In the following year, he had the role of Mark Hanson in Lifetime's thriller film Willed to Kill.

As of 2013, Bruce co-starred as Paul Dierden on the sci-fi television series Orphan Black, co-produced by Space and BBC America. He also guest-starred as Adam Donner on The CW series Arrow.

In 2014, Bruce starred as Bart Winslow in the modern remake of V.C. Andrews's Flowers in the Attic, and its sequel, Petals on the Wind. In January 2015, Bruce starred in the television movie A Novel Romance on the Hallmark Channel.

In May 2015, after leaving Orphan Black, Bruce said: "I count my lucky stars every day to have been blessed with this experience. Paul was definitely a fun character to play, I really had fun researching him and researching military guys and how they operate and how they think. It was just a really, really life-altering experience that I'll never forget."

In October 2015, Bruce appeared in Heroes Reborn as Captain James Dearing in recurring role. In 2016, Bruce starred in the action comedy movie First Round Down. He starred in the NBC series Midnight, Texas, where he played Bobo Winthrop. On August 31, 2021, Deadline announced that Bruce had joined the cast of Hallmark Movies & Mysteries film called The Christmas Promise alongside Torrey DeVitto and Patrick Duffy. Production began in early September in Vancouver. In the film, Bruce stars as Joe, a charming carpenter renovating Nicole's (DeVitto) house.

Filmography

Film

Television

References

External links

 
 Dylan Bruce at Seattle Models Guild
 Dylan Bruce at Space
 Dylan Bruce at BBC America

1980 births
21st-century Canadian male actors
Canadian expatriate male actors in the United States
Canadian male film actors
Canadian male models
Canadian male soap opera actors
Canadian male television actors
Living people
Male actors from Seattle
Male actors from Vancouver
University of Washington School of Drama alumni